Three referendums were held in Switzerland during 1925. The first was held on 24 May on a popular initiative calling for insurance for invalidity, old age and bereavement, and was rejected by voters. The second was held on 25 October on a federal resolution on the settlement and residence of foreigners, and was approved by a majority of voters and cantons. The third was held on 6 December on a federal resolution on insurance for invalidity, old age and bereavement, and was also approved by a majority of voters and cantons.

Background
The May referendum was a popular initiative, which required a double majority; a majority of the popular vote and majority of the cantons. The decision of each canton was based on the vote in that canton. Full cantons counted as one vote, whilst half cantons counted as half. The October and December referendums were both "obligatory" referendums, which also required a double majority.

Results

May referendum

October referendum
This was the 100th national referendum in the Swiss Confederation since 1848.

December referendum

References

1925 referendums
1925 in Switzerland
Referendums in Switzerland